Gregory Whelan (born December 21, 1983) is a former professional Canadian football linebacker for the Edmonton Eskimos of the Canadian Football League. He was signed by the Eskimos as an undrafted free agent in 2009. He played CIS football for the Alberta Golden Bears.

External links
Edmonton Eskimos bio

1983 births
Living people
Alberta Golden Bears football players
Canadian football linebackers
Edmonton Elks players
Players of Canadian football from Alberta
Canadian football people from Edmonton